Luke Friend (born 30 April 1996) is an English singer and former student from Teignmouth in Devon. He started his career in 2013 after winning TeenStar and appearing as a contestant and later a finalist on tenth series of The X Factor and later placed third on the show. After his career appearing on The X Factor, he signed with RCA Records in October 2014 and released his debut single "Hole in My Heart" in March 2015. On 8 April 2016, he signed to BMG. Since 28 September 2022, he has appeared as Adam in Mamma Mia! The Party at The O2 (London).

Early life
He was born in Leeds and grew up in the Chapel Allerton area of the city. He is the son of gym owner, Steve Friend. He also used to live in Shipley, Bradford, where he attended Shipley CofE Primary and Beckfoot School, before moving to Devon when he was 13. He then attended Coombeshead Academy.

Career

2013: The X Factor

In July 2013, Friend won TeenStar 2013,defeating Sam Wilde(now GODSON) in the final. That same year, Friend auditioned for the tenth series of The X Factor in front of judges Louis Walsh, Gary Barlow, Nicole Scherzinger and Sharon Osbourne. Friend's room audition, in which he sang "Stand by Me", was the first audition of the series to be broadcast. Walsh commented "You have your own style, your own finish, love your voice. You're different." and Friend received four yeses from the judges, sending him through to the arena auditions. Friend's arena audition saw him sing "Too Much Love Will Kill You", after which he was sent through to bootcamp in the Boys category, mentored by Walsh. He performed "Alone" at bootcamp, and then "Cannonball" and "Somewhere Only We Know" at judges' houses, after which he was put through to the live shows by Walsh. In week 6, Friend was in the bottom two with Sam Callahan, but was saved after Walsh refused to vote and then Scherzinger and Barlow voted to send Callahan home leaving Osbourne's vote unnecessary but stated that she would have saved Friend. In the quarter-final, he was in the bottom two with Tamera Foster. Walsh and Osbourne voted to send Friend through to the semi-final, and Scherzinger and Barlow voted to send Foster through to the semi-final and the result went to deadlock. Friend was saved by the public vote and advanced to the semi-final. In the semi-final he was in the bottom two again, this time with Rough Copy. Walsh and Osbourne voted to send Friend through to the final, while Barlow and Scherzinger voted to send Rough Copy through to the final. The result went to deadlock and Friend advanced to the final. In the final on 14 December, Friend performed a duet with Ellie Goulding and later finished in third place.

2014–15: Début single
On 19 January 2014, Friend won "Rising Star of 2014" in the Best of 2013 awards. He signed a deal with RCA Records and on 15 October 2014, a lyric video for a new song "Take On the World" was posted on his official YouTube page. His debut single is "Hole in My Heart" and the video appeared on his official YouTube page on 8 February 2015. It was officially released on 29 March and it reached 40 in the UK Singles Chart. As of 18 February 2015, his album was reportedly 90% complete. Luke has also toured Britain on his sold-out 'Hole in My Heart Tour' in Totnes, Leeds, Manchester, Glasgow, Bristol and London.

2016–2021:  Current Projects 
On 8 April 2016, Friend posted on social media a photograph of himself signing a contract with the caption "It's official I signed to @BMG time to show the world my music, a new chapter". He also announced via a Facebook live stream in March 2016 that he is also working with new management, TCB, and that new music is likely to be released later in 2016. The first three dates of a second headline tour have also been announced for 2,3 and 4 June 2016 in Birmingham, London and Manchester.

On 10 August 2018, AZTX released a single called "Karma" featuring Friend.

Friend was picked to play the part of St Jimmy in the 2019 UK tour of the musical American Idiot.

2022: Mamma Mia! The Party 
On 28 September 2022, it was announced that Friend would be joining the cast of Mamma Mia! The Party in the role of Adam.

Discography
Singles

References

1996 births
Living people
English male singers
People from Leeds
RCA Records artists